Harish Viswanathan from the Bell Labs, Alcatel-Lucent, New Providence, NJ, was named Fellow of the Institute of Electrical and Electronics Engineers (IEEE) in 2013 for contributions to wireless communication systems.

Education
PhD in Electrical Engineering from Cornell University, 1997
Master of Science in Electrical Engineering from Cornell University, 1995
Bachelor of Technology in Electrical Engineering from the Indian Institute of Technology Madras  in 1992

References 

Fellow Members of the IEEE
Living people
Cornell University College of Engineering alumni
Chief technology officers
IIT Madras alumni
Year of birth missing (living people)